This is a list of Nationalist Party MPs.  It includes all Members of Parliament elected to the British House of Commons representing the Nationalist Party (Ireland) since 1918.  Members of the Northern Ireland House of Commons are not listed.  Some Nationalist MPs did not take their seats.

Nationalist Party (Ireland)
Nationalist Party (Ireland) MPs
 
Nationalist Party MPs
Nationalist Party (Northern Ireland)